Ruchill Parish Church is an early-20th-century parish church of the Church of Scotland located in the Ruchill area of Glasgow.

History of the building
Founded as a parish church of the United Free Church of Scotland, the church was built between 1903 and 1905. It was designed by Neil Campbell Duff in the Neo-Gothic style. It was built using Old Red Sandstone. A bell tower and nave gable were also built. The church contrasts greatly with the adjoining Ruchill Church Hall, designed by Charles Rennie Mackintosh and built in 1899.

History of the congregation
Built as the Ruchill United Free Church, the church was renamed Ruchill Parish Church in 1929 upon union with the Church of Scotland. It has recently united with another congregation, adapting the name Ruchill Kelvinside Parish Church.

References

Churches completed in 1905
Church of Scotland churches in Glasgow
Listed churches in Glasgow
Category B listed buildings in Glasgow
1903 establishments in Scotland